I Was Framed is a 1942 American crime film directed by D. Ross Lederman. According to Warner Bros records the film earned $159,000 domestically and $90,000 foreign.

Plot summary

Cast
 Tod Andrews as Ken Marshall (Scott) (as Michael Ames)
 Julie Bishop as Ruth Marshall (Scott)
 Regis Toomey as Bob Leeds
 Diana Hale as Penny Marshall (Scott) (as Patty Hale)
 John Harmon as Clubby Blake
 Aldrich Bowker as Dr. Phillip Black
 Roland Drew as Dist. Atty. Gordon Locke
 Oscar O'Shea as Cal Beamish
 Wade Boteler as Ben Belden
 Howard C. Hickman as Stuart Gaines (as Howard Hickman)
 Norman Willis as Paul Brenner
 Hobart Bosworth as D.L. Wallace
 Guy Usher as Springfield Police Chief Taylor
 Sam McDaniel as Kit Carson, the Butler

References

External links
 
 
 
 

1942 films
1942 crime films
American crime films
American black-and-white films
1940s English-language films
Films directed by D. Ross Lederman
Warner Bros. films
1940s American films